Charlotta "Lotta" Kristina Johansdotter Edholm (born 8 February 1965) is a Swedish politician for the Liberals. Since 18 October 2022 she is the Minister for Schools in the Ulf Kristersson cabinet.

Biography
Edholm was born in Västerås, and has a BA in political sciences from Stockholm University. She served as a member of the Riksdag (statsrådersättare) from 1992 to 1994. She was borgarråd for schools in Stockholm from 2006-2014 and 2018-2020 as well as in opposition from 2014 to 2018. She was previously married with former party leader, Lars Leijonborg, with whom she has one son.

References

1965 births
Living people
Members of the Riksdag from the Liberals (Sweden)
Women government ministers of Sweden
Swedish Ministers for Schools